Glen Allen Taylor (born April 20, 1941) is an American billionaire business magnate and politician from Minnesota. A self-made businessman, Taylor made his fortune from being the founder and owner of Minnesota-based Taylor Corporation, one of the largest graphic communication companies in the United States.

Taylor has been the majority owner of the Minnesota Timberwolves NBA basketball team since he purchased the team in 1994. He is also the owner of the Minnesota Lynx WNBA basketball team and the part owner of the Minnesota United FC MLS soccer team. In addition to his sports team ownership, Taylor has been the owner of Minneapolis's Star Tribune newspaper, the largest newspaper in the state of Minnesota, since 2014.

A former member of the Minnesota Senate from the Republican Party, Taylor served in the state senate from 1981 until 1990. He strongly considered running for the Republican nomination for Governor of Minnesota in the 1990 Minnesota gubernatorial election, but ultimately chose not to run.

Ranked as the richest person in Minnesota, Taylor is listed on the Forbes 400 and his company ranks on the Forbes list of America's Largest Private Companies. In 2020, his net worth was reported by Forbes to be $2.5 billion.

Early life and education 
Taylor was born in Springfield, Minnesota, and grew up on a farm in Comfrey, Minnesota. He graduated from Comfrey High School in 1959, and received a Bachelor of Science in mathematics, physics and social studies from Minnesota State University, Mankato, in 1962. In 1978 he received an executive MBA from Harvard Business School.

Career 
During and after college, Taylor worked at Carlson Wedding Service (later Carlson Craft), a Mankato print shop specializing in formal invitations.  In 1975, company owner Bill Carlson wanted to retire, and Taylor offered to pay $2 million over the course of 10 years for the company. The purchase (which he paid off early) formed the basis for the Taylor Corporation, a privately held multinational printing and electronics company with more than 10,000 employees and based in North Mankato, Minnesota. Taylor continues to serve as chairman and CEO.

Taylor also owns Rembrandt Enterprises, a large egg producer, and several thousand acres of farmland across Minnesota and Iowa.

Politics 
Taylor was a Republican Minnesota State Senator from 1981 to 1990, serving as assistant minority leader from 1983 to 1985 and Minority Leader from 1985 to 1988. He considered himself a member of the party's moderate wing. He resigned in 1990 citing his need to focus more on his business interests.

He strongly considered running for Governor of Minnesota in 1990, but he decided against it due to his divorce. He was appointed as a member of the Minnesota Commission on Reform and Efficiency by fellow Republican and Governor of Minnesota Arne Carlson a year after Taylor left office. He served in that role for three years.

Still an active member of the Republican Party, from 2016 to 2020 Taylor donated $119,100 to Republican candidates and causes.

Sports team ownership 

Taylor purchased majority ownership of the Minnesota Timberwolves NBA basketball team in 1994 for a reported $94 million. and purchased the Minnesota Lynx WNBA basketball team in 1999. Taylor was in talks to buy the Minnesota Twins but nothing came of it.

In 2000, he was banned for nearly a year for signing Joe Smith to a secret contract in violation of the league's salary cap rules. Before Donald Sterling, Glen Taylor was the only NBA owner to be suspended for more than a couple of games.

In 2015, Taylor had a falling out with NBA legend Kevin Garnett over a miscommunicated agreement. Garnett had been under the impression that after his retirement from the NBA he would be able to have a minority stake in the team, as he and coach Flip Saunders had talked about the idea when Saunders traded for Garnett; however, the death of Saunders apparently put an end to the idea, and Garnett retired in 2016 after a tense buyout negotiation with Taylor, who Garnett referred to as a "snake". Taylor and Garnett are no longer on speaking terms, and Garnett refuses to have his jersey retired by the Timberwolves after spending 14 seasons of his career there.

In 2017, Taylor purchased the Iowa Energy of the NBA Development League (later called NBA G League) and renamed the team the Iowa Wolves as the developmental affiliate of the Timberwolves.

He is a past chairman of the board of governors for the NBA, serving two terms from 2008 to 2012 and from 2014 to 2017.

On April 10, 2021, it was announced that a sale of the Timberwolves was being finalized for approximately $1.5 billion, with former Major League Baseball player Alex Rodriguez and billionaire Marc Lore stepping in as new owners taking effect in 2023. Under the ownership of Taylor, the Wolves made the Conference Finals once but no further.

Taylor is also the part owner of the Minnesota United FC soccer team.

Newspaper ownership 
In 2014, he purchased the Star Tribune for about $100 million. He told MinnPost that the famously liberal Star Tribune would be decidedly less liberal under his watch, but noted that the paper had already been shifting more to the center in recent years.

References

External links 
 Biography on the Minnesota State Colleges and Universities website
 Listing on 2007 Forbes 400
 Rembrandt Foods

1941 births
American billionaires
Living people
Minnesota Timberwolves owners
Minnesota Lynx owners
Minnesota State University, Mankato alumni
Harvard Business School alumni
National Basketball Association executives
National Basketball Association owners
Politicians from Mankato, Minnesota
Women's National Basketball Association executives
Republican Party Minnesota state senators
21st-century American newspaper publishers (people)
People from Springfield, Minnesota